Robert Lui (born 23 February 1990) is an Australian professional rugby league footballer who plays as a  or  for the Townsville Blackhawks in the Queensland Cup.

He has previously played for the Wests Tigers and the North Queensland Cowboys in the NRL and the Salford Red Devils in the Super League. He spent the latter part of the 2019 Super League season on loan from Salford at the Leeds Rhinos. He moved to Leeds on a permanent basis at the conclusion of his loan move.

Background
Lui was born and brought up in Townsville, Queensland, Australia. He is of Torres Strait Islander descent.

He played his junior football with the Upper Ross Rams and later for the Centrals Tigers before being spotted by the Tigers and undertaking a scholarship at Keebra Park High on the Gold Coast, Queensland. In 2007, he made the Queensland Open Schoolboys side and accepted a scholarship with the Australian Institute of Sport. After completing high school, Lui joined the Wests Tigers NYC team in 2008.

Playing career

2009
Lui started the season playing for the Tigers' NYC team. He made his NRL debut in Round 23, in a 56–10 win over Cronulla Sharks, and played 2 further games near the end of the season. Returning to the Wests Tigers' NYC team, he played in the team that lost the Grand Final to Melbourne Storm, scoring a try in the second half. At the end of the season, Lui was named in the Toyota Cup Team of the Year.

2010
In March, Lui re-signed for the Wests Tigers to the end of the 2012 season, with coach Tim Sheens describing him as, "an integral part of the team."

Lui was named to start the season at halfback, but suffered an injury in round 2. Upon his return, in round 10, he scored his first try. Lui played 17 games in 2010, improving as the season progressed, with one newspaper describing his last game of the year, in the preliminary final, as the, "best game of his career."

2011
Lui played in 23 games in 2011, scoring 5 tries. From round 17 onward, Lui was halfback as Wests Tigers won nine games straight, eventually losing in the semi-final. Lui was said to be, "the first halfback in years to properly gel with Benji Marshall."

At the end of the 2011 season, Lui was released from his contract with the Wests Tigers after he was charged with assaulting his partner, Taleah Rae Backo, in her North Strathfield home. He had previously been charged with similar offences after an incident at the end of 2010 season, with those charges being dismissed in April. He pleaded guilty to assault occasioning actual bodily harm on his former partner and was placed on a two-year good behaviour bond and fined $2000.

2012
Lui signed a two-year contract to play for his hometown team, the North Queensland Cowboys. He made his debut for the Cowboys in Round 1, coming off the bench to play in the halves. The next few weeks Lui was pushed back to reserve grade to regain match fitness after his pre-season was hindered by a serious knee injury. He played in five games for the Northern Pride. Lui's 2012 campaign was cut short however after being suspended from playing any form of rugby league for the rest of the season after pleading guilty to an assault charge placed against him several months earlier. His ban was placed on him from Round 8. He was free to start playing rugby league again in the 2013 trials.

2013
Although being suspended for a majority of the 2012 season, Lui retained his job at the North Queensland Cowboys and remained training with the club full-time for the rest of his suspension. Before his suspension, Lui was regarded as a possible future representative player and was included in the 2011 Emerging Origin Squad for Queensland.

2014
In February 2014, Lui was a member of North Queensland's victorious Auckland Nines side. On 2 September 2014, Lui agreed to a one-year contract extension with the club, keeping him in Townsville until the end of 2015.

2015
Lui spent the majority of the 2015 season playing for North Queensland's feeder side, the Townsville Blackhawks. On 3 October, Lui signed a one-year deal with the Salford Red Devils, reuniting him former coach Tim Sheens.

2016
Lui made a total of 21 appearances for Salford in 2016 scoring 11 tries.

2017
On 23 June 2017, Salford were up by three converted tries with less than five minutes to play against St Helens.  St Helens then scored three converted tries in four minutes to make the score 24–24.  With seconds remaining, Lui tried and in-field kick which was picked up by Saints player Matty Smith who kicked a long range field goal to win the match for St Helens 25–24.

On 27 June 2017, Lui signed a long-term contract to remain at Salford.

2018
Lui made 21 appearances for Salford in 2018 and finished as the top point scorer for the club.  At the start of the year he was subject to a bid by Hull Kingston Rovers which was rejected by Salford.

2019
Lui signed on loan from the Salford Red Devils until the end of the 2019 season, and later signed a two-year contract with Leeds from the 2020 season onwards.

2020
On 17 October, Lui played in the 2020 Challenge Cup Final which Leeds won 17–16 over Salford at Wembley Stadium.

2021
Lui played a total of 11 games for Leeds in the 2021 Super League season including the club's 36-8 loss against St Helens in the semi-final.  The match was Lui's last as a player due to him announcing his retirement earlier in the year.

On 22 November 2021,it was reported that he had rejoined Townsville Blackhawks, a feeder club to the North Queensland Cowboys

Statistics

NRL
 Statistics are correct to the end of the 2014 season

Personal life
Phillip Lui, Robert's father, played for Queensland A in the late 1980s.

Former Cowboys' teammate and good friend Ray Thompson is godfather to Lui's son.

References

External links

Leeds Rhinos profile
Salford Red Devils profile
North Queensland Cowboys profile
SL profile
Salford Red Devils interview

1990 births
Living people
Australian rugby league players
Australian expatriate sportspeople in England
Indigenous Australian rugby league players
Leeds Rhinos players
North Queensland Cowboys players
Northern Pride RLFC players
People educated at Keebra Park State High School
People educated at Kirwan State High School
Rugby league five-eighths
Rugby league halfbacks
Rugby league players from Townsville
Salford Red Devils players
Torres Strait Islanders
Townsville Blackhawks players
Wests Tigers players